The Republic of China Air Force, retroactively known by its historical name the Chinese Air Force and unofficially referred to as the Taiwanese Air Force, is the military aviation branch of the Republic of China Armed Forces, currently based in Taiwan. The ROCAF was founded in 1920 by the Kuomintang. While its historical name is sometimes used especially in domestic circles, it is not used as often internationally due to the current ambiguous political status of Taiwan and to avoid confusion with the People's Liberation Army Air Force of the People's Republic of China (PRC).

Its primary mission is the defense of the airspace over and around the Taiwan area. Priorities of the ROCAF include the development of long range reconnaissance and surveillance networks, integrating C4ISTAR systems to increase battle effectiveness, procuring counterstrike weapons, next generation fighters, and hardening airfields and other facilities to survive a surprise attack.

In May 2005, the Ministry of National Defense indicated its intention to transfer command of all defensive missile systems to the ROCAF, while future offensive missiles would be placed under a newly formed missile command. As of 2006, all medium and long range SAM units were transferred from ROC Army's Missile Command to ROCAF, while ROCAF's airbase security units were transferred to ROC Army Military Police. However, it was revealed that in January 2011, five years of problems of integrating those long range ex-ROC Army SAM units into ROCAF has forced ROCAF high command to return those units back to ROC Army's Missile Command. Missile Command is now directly under Defense Ministry's GHQ control.

In July 2010, former United States Air Force deputy under secretary for international affairs, Bruce Lemkin, said that Taiwan's ability to defend its airspace had degraded due to its aging fighters and that the sale of new US fighter aircraft to Taiwan was an urgent priority. However, the ROC Air Force has trouble getting fighter planes from abroad due to mainland China's attempts to suppress fighter sales from any country. The People's Republic of China has called the F-16 fighter or any foreign fighter sales a "red line". It is believed that mainland China plans to eliminate the ROC Air Force by preventing any sale of new aircraft whilst gradually wearing its ageing fighters into an inoperable state as they have to frequently intercept PLAAF aircraft who perform almost daily approaches to ROC airspace. According to the former Republic of China's defense minister, Yen Teh-fa, the People's Republic of China sends about 2,000 bomber patrols per year to the Taiwan Strait separating Taiwan and the Chinese mainland These patrols significantly increased since 2019 and now routinely crosses the median line in Taiwan's air defense zones, causing the scrambling of fighters. These air scrambles put heavy strain on ROC airforce aircraft and cost around 9% of Taiwan's national defense budget or about T$25.5 billion ($886.49 million) in 2020 alone.

ROCAF strategy until some years ago was to use IDF fighters for low altitude interception and ground attack, F-16s for mid-altitude interception and ground attack and Mirage 2000-5s for high altitude interception. Taiwan had to upgrade F-5 fighters due to issues in buying modern fighters. In proposed defense policy, the ROCAF seeks to deny the PLAAF air operations around Taiwan by deploying integrated air defenses, including Patriot PAC-3 batteries and Tian Kung-2 surface to air missiles assigned to defend air bases, and smaller mobile air defense systems to prevent the PLA from providing air support to invading forces.

Organization

Like most of the other branches of the ROC armed forces, much of the ROCAF's structure and organization is patterned after the United States Air Force. Like the USAF, the ROCAF used to have a wing → group → squadron structure. After November 2004, tactical fighter wing switch to wing → Tactical Fighter Group, with some fighter squadrons stood down, with each tactical fighter group, still pretty much the same size as a squadron, now commanded by a full colonel.

The main operational units in Taiwan Air Force include:
 6 tactical combat aircraft wings.
 1 transport and antisubmarine wing.
 1 tactical control wing.
 1 communication and ATC wing.
 1 weather forecasting wing.
 1 Air Defense and Artillery command, comprising 5 Brigade, 16 air defense artillery battalions.

Republic of China Air Force Command Headquarters 

Air Force GHQ is subordinate to the Chief of the General Staff (military), the Minister of National Defense (civilian) and the President.
Internal Units: Personnel, Combat Readiness and Training, Logistics, Planning, Communications, Electronics & Information, General Affairs, Comptroller, Inspector General, Political Warfare.
Air Force Combatant Command 
Weather Wing: Tamsui, New Taipei City
Communications, Air Traffic Control & Information Wing : Taipei City
Air Tactical Control Wing 
 Ground fixed and mobile long-range air search radar sites, consist of various TPS-117, TPS-75V, FPS-117, GE-592 and HADR radars, plus 1 PAVE PAWS (Phased Array Warning System) early warning radar site in northern Taiwan, will enter service late 2012.
Air Force Air Defense and Missile Command 
 5 Air Force Air Defense and Artillery Brigade, 791st Brigade, 792st Brigade, 793st Brigade, 794st Brigade,795st Brigade
 2 Air Defense Missile I-HAWK battalions, 621st, and 623th battalions, with 9 companies/batteries.
 2 TK-1/2 Air Defense Missile battalion, 793st Brigade, 611st battalion with 6 companies/batteries.
 4 TK-3 Air Defense Missile battalion, 792st Brigade.
 3 Patriot PAC-2+ GEM/PAC-3 Air Defense/Anti-Ballistic Missile battalion, with 9 mixed companies/batteries that are all upgrading to PAC-3 standard, with 6 more PAC 3 companies/batteries on order.
 1 Skyguard Short Range Airbase Air Defense battalion, with 6 companies/batteries and radar sub units with OTO 35mm AAA, s
 2 Antelope Short Range Airbase Air Defense battalions, with unknown companies/batteries.
 At least 2 AAA Air Defense Artillery battalions, with 40mm/L70 and 20mm AAA guns.
Air Defense Artillery Training Center: Pingtung
Target Service Squadron
Education Service Support Company
First training company
Second training company
Third training company
Education, Training & Doctrine Command

History

Post-imperial China
The Qing Dynasty had established aircraft operations at the Beijing Nanyuan airfield in 1909, just before the abolishment of their rule following the Double Ten Revolution in 1911, and became the airbase to where the early beginnings of the Republic of China Air Force took shape. In July 1917, Qing loyalist general Zhang Xun led the Manchu Restoration, and then-Premier of the Republic Duan Qirui ordered the bombing of the Forbidden City; the mission was carried out in a Caudron Type D aircraft piloted by Pan Shizhong and bombardier Du Yuyuan flying out of Nanyuan airfield, dropping three bombs over the Forbidden City, which caused the fatality of a eunuch, but otherwise inflicted minor damage.

Before Civil War 
Formally established in 1920 as the Aviation Ministry, the ROCAF was active during the tenure of the ROC on Mainland China. In this period, various airplanes were purchased and deployed by warlords in their struggle for power until nominal Chinese reunification in 1928. The ROCAF immediately dispatched combat aircraft to the Hongqiao Aerodrome during the January 28th Incident of 1932, and aerial skirmishes occurred for the first time between China and the Imperial Japanese. In February 1932, US Reserve Lt. Robert McCawley Short, who was transporting armed Chinese aircraft, shot down an IJN aircraft on February 19, 1932, and downed another on February 22 before he was killed (he was posthumously raised to the rank of colonel in the Chinese Air Service).

During the Second Sino-Japanese War (1937–1945), the ROCAF participated in attacks on Japanese warships on the eastern front and along the Yangtze river including support for the Battle of Shanghai in 1937. The Chinese frontline fighter aircraft were initially mainly the Curtiss Hawk IIs and Hawk IIIs (including those license-built locally at the CAMCO plant) and the Boeing P-26 model 281, and engaged Japanese fighters in many major air battles beginning on August 14, 1937, when Imperial Japanese Navy warplanes raided Chienchiao airbase; "814" has thus become known as "Air Force Day". Chinese Boeing P-26/281 fighters engaged Japanese Mitsubishi A5M fighters in what is among the world's first aerial dogfighting between all-metal monoplane fighter aircraft. A unique mission in May 1938 saw two Chinese B-10 bombers fly a mission over Japan, but dropping only propaganda leaflets over the Japanese cities of Nagasaki and Saga, four years before 1942 Doolittle Raid on Japanese home islands. It was a war of attrition for the Chinese pilots, as many of their most experienced ace fighter pilots, such as Lieutenant  and Colonel Kao Chih-hang were lost early in the war. Code breaking operations played a role in the conflict. A Japanese radio intercept unit was attached to the landing forces at Shanghai. IJN Lt. Commander Tsunezo Wachi and a Lt. Yamada, an expert in Chinese codes, enabled Japanese to make preemptive strikes against ROCAF airfields.

As the War of Resistance raged on after the Fall of Shanghai, Nanking and Taiyuan at the end of 1937, new main battle lines were immediately drawn at the Battle of Wuhan, Battle of Taierzhuang, Battle of Canton, and the ROCAF received its primary support through the Sino-Soviet Non-Aggression Pact of 1937, along with the support of the Soviet Volunteer Group, from 1937 to 1939 in return for raw materials.

Following the Japanese invasion of French Indochina, the U.S. enacted an oil and steel embargo against Japan in August 1941, and China was included in the Lend-Lease Act which superseded the Sino-Soviet Non-Aggression Pact of 1937. As the Battle of Chonqing-Chengdu continued into 1941 with Operating 102, the Japanese began preparations for Operation Z; the attack plan on Pearl Harbor. In the latter half of the Sino-Japanese War.

World War II, the ROCAF was augmented by a volunteer group of American pilots (the Flying Tigers whom fought their first combat engagement on 20 December 1941). Throughout the remainder of the war, the ROCAF was involved in attacks on Japanese air and ground forces across the Chinese theatre.

From Civil War 
ROCAF General HQ was established in June 1946. From 1946 to 1948, during the Chinese Civil War, the ROCAF participated in combat against the People's Liberation Army engaging in air-to-air combat on at least eleven occasions in the areas surrounding the Taiwan Strait. The ROCAF reportedly enjoyed a 31:1 kill ratio against the PLA. GHQ was evacuated to Taiwan along with the rest of the ROC Government in April 1949 following the Communist victory in the Chinese Civil War. The ROCAF assisted in halting the PLA advance at the Battle of Kuningtou on Kinmen the same year.

The ROCAF regularly patrolled the Taiwan Straits and fought many engagements with its Communist counterpart (the PLAAF). The ROCAF received second hand equipment from the US at that time, such as the F-86, F-100 and F-104.

During the Cold War, the ROCAF was involved in combat air patrols over the Taiwan Strait and engaged the PLAAF and PLAN-AF on several occasions. The ROCAF was also the testbed of American technology at this time. The first successful kill scored by an air-to-air missile was accomplished by a ROCAF F-86 Sabre with then experimental AIM-9 Sidewinder. ROCAF pilots also flew U-2 recon overflights of the PRC during this time with assistance from the USAF. Known as the Black Cat Squadron they flew a total of 220 missions, with 102 missions over mainland China, losing 5 aircraft. All five were shot down by SA-2 surface-to-air missiles, the same type of surface-to-air missile that shot down Gary Powers over the USSR in 1960. The 34th "Black Bat Squadron" flew low level missions into China as part of its mapping PRC growing air defense networks, conducting ESM and ECM missions, inserting agents behind enemy lines, and air drop resupply missions.

Starting in November 1967, the ROC secretly operated a cargo transport detachment to assist the US and the ROV as part of its participation in the Vietnam War. It was based on existing formation of the 34th squadron of ROC Air force. The unit's strength included two C-123 cargo aircraft, seven flight officers and two mechanics, even though a higher number of military personnel was involved through rotation. It was tasked with air transportation, airdrop and electronic reconnaissance. Some 25 members of the unit were killed, among them 17 pilots and co-pilots, and three aircraft were lost. Other ROC involvement in Vietnam included a secret listening station, special reconnaissance and raiding squads, military advisers and civilian airline operations (which cost a further two aircraft due to Vietnamese individually operated AA missiles).

From 1979 to 1990, the ROCAF engaged in a classified military aid program in the Yemen Arab Republic, known as the Great Desert Program. The program started after American President Jimmy Carter rushed 14 F-5s to the Yemeni Air Force who had no pilots or ground crew trained to operate the type or even any Western aircraft (they previously operated MiG-15s). The Americans and the Saudis (who were bankrolling the Yemen Arab Republic's military) requested military aid from Taiwan who provided 80 F-5 pilots, ground crews, early warning radars, and anti-aircraft missile batteries. All told more than a thousand ROCAF personnel were deployed to Yemen.

The opposing Air Force of South Yemen was made up of Cuban pilots and maintainers with some Soviet advisors and pilots as well. The ROCAF force were actively involved in combat with the Cubans/Soviets and for all intents and purposes constitutes the Yemen Arab Republic's Air Force during this time. Taiwanese pilots scored a number of kills in Yemen. The program ended in 1990 when Saudi Arabia withdrew its diplomatic recognition of Taiwan.

From democratization 
The transition to democracy was difficult for the ROCAF and the Taiwanese military overall. During the martial law period the military was a pillar of totalitarianism and dictatorship and for this reason was mistrusted by the Taiwanese public. Spending and personnel levels fell from the beginning of democratization until the Tsai Ing-wen administration began increasing military spending in 2016. Efforts have been made to enhance the status of the military in the eyes of the public.

The ROCAF has been under increasing financial and physical pressure due to an increase in PLA Air Force intrusions into Taiwanese airspace and subsequent interception by Taiwanese fighters.

On November 29, 2020, the ROCAF celebrated its 100th birthday. On the event of their 100th birthday Taiwanese President Tsai Ing-wen commended the "loyal and fearless heroes" of the Air Force and added that "The sound of the roaring engine is our guardian, the voice of democracy and freedom."

Humanitarian operations
The ROCAF has also taken part in numerous humanitarian operations. Some of the more major ones include the following:
 Indian Ocean earthquake and tsunami, December 2004
 Haiti earthquake, January 2010
 Typhoon Haiyan, November 2013

ROCAF losses

Equipment and procurement

Current ROCAF inventory includes over 400 combat aircraft, the mainstays being the AIDC F-CK-1 Ching-kuo IDF (Indigenous Defense Fighter) and F-16 while the Mirage 2000-5 provides the most formidable air-defense capabilities. Older F-5 fighters are gradually being phased out but remain in service.

The United States serves as the ROCAF's main supplier of equipment and also provides training for ROCAF and ROC Navy pilots at Luke AFB in Arizona. This base which is between Phoenix and Tucson has an instrumented flight area for training approximately the size of the State of Connecticut. German Air Force (Luftwaffe) and German Naval Aviation (Marineflieger) who used to train at Luke AFB from 1957 to 1983 now train at NATO facilities at CFB Goose Bay in Canada and also alongside the USAF at Holloman AFB in New Mexico. As of 2019 the US Air Force is assisting the Taiwanese Air Force in sourcing new and surplus F-5 parts.

Domestic development

Prior to 1984, ROCAF fighters were almost exclusively American-made aircraft sold under terms of a mutual defense treaty between the Republic of China and the United States. Development of the F-CK-1 Ching-kuo Indigenous Defense Fighter (IDF) began in 1984 due to U.S. refusal to sell F-20s and F-16s to the ROCAF as a result of changes in national policy between the U.S. and the People's Republic of China. After a successful maiden flight in 1989, the domestically produced fighter entered service in 1994. However, the ROCAF was subsequently able to obtain F-16s from the United States as well as Mirage 2000-5 fighters from France, resulting in delays to later IDF development that had been anticipated.

In response to American refusals to supply "smart bombs", Taiwan is developing their own equivalent of the Joint Direct Attack Munition for attacks against the PRC mainland in case of invasion preparations.

Taiwan is looking to replace its current fleet of AT-3 jet trainers and F-5 LIFT planes with 66 advanced trainers. In 2008 the Republic of China Air Force released a request for information (RFI) and two companies including Lockheed Martin for the T-50 and Alenia Aermacchi's M-346 responded to the request. These planes were expected to be license produced in Taiwan with a local partner firm, and the overall estimated contract value was 69 billion New Taiwan dollars (US$2.2 billion). However, after the election of President Tsai Ing-wen, who intends to make Taiwan's defense industry a cornerstone for future development, it was decided to domestically design and build 66 AIDC T-5 Brave Eagle supersonic trainers instead of selecting the T-50 or M-346. The T-5, with a program cost of NT$68.6 billion, will be a new aircraft whose design will draw upon Taiwan's expertise gained by building the domestically produced Indigenous Defense Fighter.

In 2019 the Taiwan Air Force's Air Defense and Missile Command announced a five-year, NT$80b (US$2.54b) project to build up a full force of anti-radiation UAVs made by NCSIST.

In 2021 April 15 NCSIST stated that its development of a next-generation fighter was progressing ahead of schedule and that the overall design and engine production would be completed by 2024.

Foreign procurement

One of the first modern jets purchased was the Northrop F-5. In 1974 a total of 308 were purchased but, lacking spare parts, the ROC has been forced to salvage them from inoperable F-5s. Taiwan is considering reusing engines from inoperable F-5s in cruise missiles.

The Aerospace Industrial Development Corporation (AIDC), previously known as Aero Industry Development Center, was founded in 1969 under the authority of the Republic of China Air Force to locally produce spares and military aircraft. It was transferred to Chung-Shan Institute of Science and Technology (CSIST) in 1983. By 1973 AIDC had built 242 F-5Es and 66 F-5Fs under license.

In 1992 Taiwan purchased 150 F-16A/B fighter jets from the United States. In the same year, 60 Dassault Mirage 2000-5s were ordered. Forty-eight would be single-seat Mirage 2000-5EI interceptors and 12 would be Mirage 2000-5DI trainers. The version of Mirage 2000-EI5 has the mid-air refuel capability and ground attack ability deleted.

On February 28, 2007, the US Defense Department approved an order made by the ROC for 218 AIM-120C-7 AMRAAM missiles, as well as 235 AGM-65G2 Maverick missiles, associated launchers and other equipment. The total value of this order was revealed to be US$421 million.

In June 2007, the Legislative Yuan also approved the upgrade of the existing Patriot PAC-2 batteries to PAC-3 standard, and, in November, the Pentagon notified the U.S. Congress of the Patriot upgrade order. On August 10, 2007, a shipment of Harpoon anti-ship missiles, valued at an estimated $125 million, was also authorised by the U.S. Defense Department, including 60 AGM-84L Block II missiles and 50 upgrade kits to bring the ROCAF's existing Harpoons up to Block II, Mark L standard.

On October 3, 2008, arms notifications were sent to Congress concerning, amongst other things, the sale of 330 PAC-3 missiles, four missile batteries, radar sets, ground stations and other equipment valued up to US$3.1 billion, the upgrade of 4 E-2T aircraft to the Hawkeye 2000 standard and US$334 million worth of spare parts for the ROCAF's F-16s, IDFs, F-5E/Fs and C-130s.

Late in January 2010, ROCAF received the first batch of new Sky Sword II BVR missiles ordered from CSIST, believed to have new radar seeker and improved performance from the original version which entered service over 10 years previously. The U.S. government also announced five notifications to Congress for additional arms sales totaling some US$6.39 Billion, under which the ROCAF will receive 3 PAC-3 batteries with 26 launchers and 114 PAC-3 missiles. On February 3, 2010, ROCAF also announced at a Singapore Airshow that it had signed a new contract for 3 EC-225 SAR (Search-And-Rescue) helicopters that was awarded to Eurocopter back in December 2009 for US$111 million, along with options for 17 more EC-225s. On November 26, 2011, the 3 EC-225 C-SAR helicopters were loaded on board an An-124 cargo aircraft and delivered to Chai-yi AB in Taiwan, and should enter service on July 1, 2012.

On August 31, 2010, it was announced for next year's defense budget, ROCAF's "Medium Transport aircraft" plan to replace 12 B-1900 VIP/transport training aircraft, believed to be 6-8+ Lockheed C-27J, has been put on hold and might be axed, due to lack of budget, but will allocate 20+ million US dollars over next 4 years for quick runway repair. Other items mentioned including increases in runways from 3 to 6 at Eastern Taiwan's 3 airbases, moving 2 I-HAWK batteries to Eastern Taiwan to protect those airbases, which will double to 4 batteries, and others. On November 8, 2011, a second pair of E-2T Hawkeye AEW (s/n 2501 and 2502) were loaded on a ship and sent to the US for upgrade to the E-2C 2000 standard. The first pair of E-2T (s/n 2503 and 2504) were sent to the US in June 2010 and returned to Taiwan on December 18, 2011, and will be return to service by end of the year.

On August 15, 2011, the United States again deferred the ROCAF request to purchase 66 new F-16C/Ds but offered an upgrade for ROCAF's older F-16A/Bs to F-16V standard, including AN/APG-83 Scalable Agile Beam AESA radars. Unfortunately, during the upgrade work the F-16A/Bs were found to have rusting issues due to age and Taiwan's climate. The upgrade was to be spread over 12 years, though the Ministry of Defense indicated that it would try to reduce the period.

In November 2011, the United States-China Economic and Security Review Commission recommended that new fighters be sold to the ROCAF. Taiwan also baulked at the cost of the radar upgrade, not wanting to be the lead customer paying to develop the V-standard upgrade and also because it will be unable to afford both the upgrade and new fighters, should those be offered. In response to a vote in the US House of Representatives to force sale of C/D models, the ROC MND said that the V-standard upgrade package offered superior capabilities over the C/D model aircraft. Some defense officials said that in light of the PRC's increasing capabilities, only F-35s would be sufficient to defend Taiwan. A Pentagon report corroborated that claim, asserting that the PRC would probably seek to destroy ROCAF airfields in the first stages of any attack, making a STOVL fighter such as the F-35B vital for effective defense.

In July 2012, Taiwan's Aerospace Industrial Development Corp. and Lockheed Martin announced plans to establish a maintenance and overhaul center to upgrade and maintain the F-16s in place without having to ship them back to the United States. In 2012 a letter of acceptance was agreed on for a US$3.8 billion deal that included the radars, electronic warfare, structural improvements and new weapons. The Air Force received the first upgraded F-16V in 2018.

On April 10, 2019, Air Force Chief of Staff Liu Jen-yuan stated that the Air Force is asking for a total of 66 new-build F-16Vs from the U.S. to replace its aging and obsolete F-5 fighters. On August 20, 2019, the sale of F-16Vs was approved by the State Department and submitted to Congress for approval. The 66 F-16s will be supplied with 75 General Electric F110 engines and 75 AN/APG-83. They will also have new mission computers, datalinks, electronic warfare systems, and compatibility with the Joint Helmet Mounted Cueing System II which Taiwan will equip part of its new F-16s with. The final signing of the Letter of Offer and Acceptance (LOA) for the purchase of 66 F-16V fighter jets was confirmed on December 21, 2019.

Hardened bases and survivability 
Taiwan faces the threat of Chinese missile strike on its airfields. PLA accurate ballistic missiles and cruise missiles can damage or destroy airfields and aircraft on the ground. Taiwan has hardened key Air Force facilities and built redundancies into critical
infrastructure so that it can absorb and survive a long-range missile precision attack.

Taiwan Air Force built at least 400 protected revetments in its 9 bases, approximately half of them covered. Underground hangars were built at Chiashan Air Force Base in Hualien that reportedly can protect over half of Taiwan's tactical fighter aircraft. Other underground shelters exist at Chihhang Air Base and perhaps elsewhere. But missiles can target the runways with warheads designed to crater them and so prevent Taiwan's aircraft from taking off.
 
Taiwan regularly practices dispersing its aircraft from the more vulnerable West coast bases to the East coast. Units are also moved between bases to make it more difficult to know where they might be at any given time. Dummy aircraft are parked on bases and inside shelters to confuse Chinese intelligence. Besides this Taiwan maintains emergency highway strips where planes can land, refuel, rearm and take off in the event that bases are out of service. Each Taiwanese airbase has an engineering unit attached for rapidly repairing runways.

Taiwan is working to provide additional layers of defenses around military airfields against cruise missiles, antiradiation missiles and small drones, as well as potentially larger threats, such as helicopters and low-flying aircraft. Ground version of Sea Oryx SAM and Phalanx CIWS are being developed and deployed to improve air defense.

One of the primary methods of surviving in case of war will be deception and the use of decoy targets. This applies to decoy planes, SAM launchers, radars, etc. Decoys makes use of Taiwan's geographic advantages, especially its mountainous and urban terrain which complicate enemy targeting and kill chain completion.

Accidents and incidents

Rank and rating insignia 
Officers

Enlisted

Inventory

Aircraft

Armament

Air Defense

ROCAF Squadron emblems

See also 
 Development of Chinese Nationalist air force (1937–45)
 Central Aircraft Manufacturing Company, also known as CAMCO
 Flying Tigers
 Black Bat Squadron
 Black Cat Squadron
 Republic of China Air Force Academy
 Air Force Institute of Technology
 Republic of China Air Force Museum
 Ministry of National Defense (Republic of China)
 Republic of China Armed Forces
 Republic of China Army
 Republic of China Navy
 Republic of China Marine Corps
 Republic of China Military Police
 People's Liberation Army Air Force
 Political status of Taiwan

Notes

References

Citations

Bibliography

External links 

 ROCAF website 
 ROC active aircraft  

 
Military units and formations established in 1920